"Simply Jessie" is a song by singer/actor Rex Smith, released as the second single from his third studio album Sooner or Later. The song is also featured in the 1979 made-for-television film of the same title starring Smith and Denise Miller. It was produced by Charles Calello and Stephen Lawrence, and written by Lawrence and Bruce Hart.

The song reached number 31 on the U.S. Billboard Adult Contemporary chart in August 1979, with a total of 9 weeks on the chart.

A popular song in the Philippines, it has been covered by local singers Ogie Alcasid and Sharon Cuneta and sampled by rapper Genezide.

References

1979 songs
1979 singles
Rex Smith songs
Columbia Records singles
Songs written for films
Songs written by Bruce Hart (songwriter)
Songs with music by Stephen J. Lawrence